The Smart-UPS is a series of enterprise-level uninterruptible power supplies (UPS) made by American Power Conversion (APC).  Most of the units have a SmartSlot (with the exception of SC and SMC series) which accepts an optional interface card providing features ranging from network connectivity to temperature and humidity monitoring.  With the exception of RT and SRT series, Smart-UPS units are line-interactive UPS systems, only running their inverters when the grid power is unavailable.

Models 

There are a few different variations in the Smart-UPS lineup.

Management software 
 All Smart-UPS units work with APC's proprietary PowerChute software which is available for a variety of operating systems.
 A free alternative to PowerChute is the Free software project APC UPS Daemon (Apcupsd), which supports Linux, Mac OS X, UNIX and Microsoft Windows operating systems and can run in stand alone or client-server modes.
 Legacy Smart-UPS (Not SMX, SMT, or SURTD series ) can also work with Network UPS Tools (NUT), a third party application, under Linux.  The software is designed to safely and automatically shut down any connected computers before the batteries are depleted.

Data interfaces 

As a way to provide UPS management, monitoring and automatic shutdown of attached equipment, all Smart-UPS models include at least one serial data interface (RS-232 or USB), while most models also have at least one SmartSlot expansion port, with the larger (and in many cases older) Smart-UPS models supporting two SmartSlots.  Availability of more SmartSlots in a single Smart-UPS unit can be achieved via expansion modules such as the AP9600 and AP9604 models.  Installing an add-on card into a SmartSlot will provide the UPS with additional features, capable beyond the default serial data interface.

Early SmartSlot cards, such as the AP9605, provide SNMP functionality and Telnet access.  The AP9606 and later cards add a web interface that can be used to configure and administer the UPS, as well as email-based alerting.  The AP9617 and newer cards add 10/100Base-T connectivity, Secure HTTP, Secure Shell (SSH), RADIUS, SNMP Version 3, PCNS and syslog functionalities.  The AP9612, AP9618, AP9619 and AP9631 models provide environmental monitoring when used together with APC temperature/humidity probes.  The AP9618 model also provides out-of-band management via a modem connection in case the 10/100 Ethernet connection is down.

SmartSlot cards remain powered by the battery even when the UPS is switched off, allowing the UPS to be remotely cold-started even in a power loss situation (presuming the network infrastructure is still powered up and functioning).  The cards will also continue to work for a short while after the UPS has been switched off either manually or due to a low battery condition.

Beginning with the 2009 release of the SMT models (and later SMX and SURTD models), the old RS-232 data interface (a serial port with DB-9 connector) has been replaced with a 10-pin RJ50 socket and an RJ50-to-DB-9 cable connecting to the protected computer's serial port (together with a standard USB interface).  Also, SmartSlot interface has been electrically modified in a backward-incompatible way and appropriately keyed mechanically.  As stated by APC, "the new connection arrangement denotes the new signalling systems."  These new serial and SmartSlot interfaces use the new Microlink signalling protocol which, unlike the previous APC protocol UPSLINK,  has not been publicly documented.  However, using the new AP9620 interface card, users are able to add support for the previous signalling protocol to the newer SMT and SMX models.  Addition of this card makes the current models backwards compatible with older software built for the older Smart-UPS series.

, an additional option has been made available in form of new firmware for certain SMT and SURTD models, adding publicly documented Modbus signalling capability to the proprietary Microlink protocol, allowing third-party developers to support UPS signalling and control on the newer Smart-UPS series.

SmartSlot card models 

In late 2009, with the release of the SMT and SMX product lines, SmartSlot was migrated to a new communications platform utilizing the APC Microlink protocol.  Both electrical and mechanical (slot keying) properties of the new SmartSlot make older SmartSlot cards incompatible with current Smart-UPS models.  For example, current Smart-UPS model SMT1500 is compatible only with AP9613, AP9620, AP9630 and AP9631 SmartSlot cards.

This new card/slot design is referred-to as "Network Management Card 2" or NMC2.  However, most NMC2 cards (including AP9613, AP9630 and AP9631) are backward compatible with older Smart-UPS models.

In 2019, APC released Network Management Card 3 or NMC3 (AP9640/AP9641), superseding NMC2 cards. NMC 3 offers enhanced security (Security chip onboard), faster communication (1000BASE/T) and increased space for data and event logs.

See also
 Apcupsd
 Network UPS Tools (NUT)

References

External links 

 Technical Comparison of On-line vs. Line-interactive UPS Designs APC White Paper #79, by Jeffrey Samstad and Michael Hoff

Electric power systems components
Uninterruptible power supply